Carl, My Childhood Symphony is a 1994 Danish drama film directed by Erik Clausen. The film was selected as the Danish entry for the Best Foreign Language Film at the 67th Academy Awards, but was not accepted as a nominee.

The film is about the childhood of the Danish composer Carl Nielsen.

Cast 
 Morten Gundel as Carl I
 Anders Forchhammer as Carl II
 Nikolaj Lie Kaas as Carl III (as Nikolaj Kaas)
 Stina Ekblad as Maren Kirstine
 Jesper Milsted as Niels Maler
 Leif Sylvester as Blinde Anders
 Frits Helmuth as Outzen
 Jesper Christensen as Schreiber

See also 
 List of submissions to the 67th Academy Awards for Best Foreign Language Film
 List of Danish submissions for the Academy Award for Best Foreign Language Film

References

External links 
 
 
 

1994 films
1994 drama films
Danish drama films
1990s Danish-language films
Films directed by Erik Clausen